John Denis Alphonsus O'Connor (9 September 187523 August 1941) was an Australian cricketer who played in four Tests from January 1908 to May 1909. On his debut, he took five wickets in the second innings against England in Adelaide.

O'Connor played first-class cricket for New South Wales from 1905 to early 1906, and for South Australia from late 1906 to 1910. He toured England with the Australian team in 1909.

See also
 List of New South Wales representative cricketers

References

External links
 

1875 births
1941 deaths
Australia Test cricketers
New South Wales cricketers
South Australia cricketers
Australian cricketers
Cricketers who have taken five wickets on Test debut
Cricketers from New South Wales